WGLY-FM (91.5 FM, "The Light") is a Christian radio station licensed to Bolton, Vermont, serving the Burlington, Vermont area. The station is owned by Christian Ministries, Inc.

Programming
The Light Radio Network's programming includes Christian Talk and Teaching and Christian music. Christian Talk and Teaching shows heard on The Light Radio network include; Mornings with Shawn, The Gail Robbins Show, Saturday's With Susan,  The Brant Hansen Show, Turning Point with David Jeremiah, Truth for Life with Alistair Begg,  Enjoying Everyday Life with Joyce Meyer, Insight For Living with Chuck Swindoll, Joni and Friends, Focus On The Family, and In The Market with Janet Parshall.  The Light Radio Network also carries Air 1 programming on WGLY-FM HD2, and repeaters.

Stations
The Light Radio Network is also heard on five other full powered stations in Vermont, as well as four low powered translators.

Translators

History
WGLY-FM began broadcasting in 1996, holding the call sign WCMK. The station's call sign was changed to WGLY-FM in 1999.

WGLG was formerly WNGF, owned by Northeast Gospel Broadcasting; in August 2013, Christian Ministries reached a deal to acquire WNGF. Upon the deal's completion on April 15, 2014, WNGF's call letters were changed to WGLG.

WFAD was formerly owned by Northeast Broadcasting; in December 2022, Christian Ministries agreed to acquire the station. Following the deal's completion in February 2023, WFAD was expected to switch from carrying Northeast's The Point network to The Light.

References

External links
 

GLY-FM
Radio stations established in 1996
1996 establishments in Vermont